Granite Historic District is a national historic district in Granite, Baltimore County, Maryland, United States. It comprises the focus of a rural quarrying community located in the Patapsco Valley of western Baltimore County, Maryland. It includes two churches, a school, a social hall, former commercial buildings, and houses and outbuildings, representing the period from the initial settlement of the area about 1750 through the early 20th century, when the village achieved its present form. The district also includes the former Waltersville quarry, one of two major granite operations in the region during the period. Granite from the Waltersville and Fox Rock quarries was utilized in construction of the Baltimore & Ohio Railroad in the 1830s, and later in such projects as the Library of Congress, old Treasury Building, and parts of the inner walls of the Washington Monument in Washington, D.C., and numerous other projects in Baltimore city and county.

It was added to the National Register of Historic Places in 1994.

References

External links

, at Maryland Historical Trust
Boundary Map of the Granite Historic District, Baltimore County, including photo from 1994, at Maryland Historical Trust

Historic districts in Baltimore County, Maryland
Victorian architecture in Maryland
Historic districts on the National Register of Historic Places in Maryland
National Register of Historic Places in Baltimore County, Maryland